Paulina is an 'L' station on the Chicago Transit Authority's Brown Line. It is an elevated station with two side platforms, located at 3410 North Lincoln Avenue (3400 N; 1700 W), in Chicago's Lakeview neighborhood, close to Roscoe Village. The stations that are adjacent to Paulina are Addison, about three eighths of a mile (0.6 km) to the northwest and Southport, about three eighths of a mile (0.6 km) to the east.

History
Paulina Station opened in 1907 as part of the Northwestern Elevated Railroad's Ravenswood branch. The station closed on September 2, 1973, but reopened on October 17 of the same year. Upon reopening, the station was only open on weekdays from 6:30 AM to 6:30 PM. On November 29, 1987, the station returned to full operational status and was open at all times the Ravenswood Line operated.

Brown Line Capacity Expansion Project

The Brown Line Capacity Expansion Project aims to allow eight car trains on the Brown Line by the extension of the platforms at all stations. This was due to the fact that there was not enough physical space in the smaller car trains for people to fit in them during the morning rush hour, causing people to wait for another train, sometimes two. At the same time all Brown Line stations are being rebuilt to meet ADA requirements. As part of this project, Paulina station closed on March 30, 2008, for demolition and replacement with a new station. The new station opened on April 3, 2009.

Notes and references

Notes

References

External links 

 Train schedule (PDF) at CTA official site
Paulina Street (Lincoln Avenue) (Then Under Construction) entrance from Google Maps Street View
Brown Line Capacity Expansion Project Meet the Contractor March 7th 2007

CTA Brown Line stations
Railway stations in the United States opened in 1907
1907 establishments in Illinois